Mike Pressler (born February 27, 1960) is an American lacrosse coach. He has been the head coach of the Bryant Bulldogs since 2007. He served as the head coach of the Duke Blue Devils for 16 seasons until he was forced to resign during the Duke lacrosse case in 2006. He received the F. Morris Touchstone Award for the men's college lacrosse coach of the year in 2005. In 2010, he coached the United States men's national lacrosse team to a gold medal.

Career

Pressler attended Wilton High School, then Washington & Lee University, graduating in 1982. He was an outstanding lacrosse and football player, a four-year starter in both sports.

Pressler was the head coach at Virginia Military Institute for one year before leaving to serve as an assistant coach at the United States Military Academy under the tutelage of his former coach, Jack Emmer.

After West Point, Pressler was the head coach at Ohio Wesleyan University (OWU). In October 2007, he was inducted into the Ohio Wesleyan University Hall of Fame. During his 5-year tenure at OWU from 1986 through 1990, Pressler amassed a 69–16 record, four NCAC championships, five visits to the  NCAA Division III semi-finals, three NCAA Division III Championship game appearances, 29 All-American selections, and five NCAA Division III players of the year. His contributions to the OWU lacrosse program made him the winningest coach (.812) in OWU's over 50-year lacrosse history.

Pressler was hired by Bryant University to lead their lacrosse team in 2007. In June 2022, Pressler announced his retirement from coaching.

Duke
Pressler became coach of the Duke Blue Devils in 1991. Over 16 seasons he compiled a 153–82 record at Duke, winning the Atlantic Coast Conference championship three times and leading his team to 10 NCAA Division I tournament appearances as well as the men's national championship game in 2005. Pressler was voted ACC Coach of the Year three times and also was honored as the USILA National Coach of the Year in 2005.

He was fired in 2006 in the wake of allegations of rape against three athletes in the program that proved to be baseless. Pressler's firing was publicly portrayed by Duke as a resignation, which gave rise to the implication that the coach resigned due to the students' presumed guilt. Pressler believed the players were innocent and had argued that the lacrosse season should not be canceled until the DNA test results were returned. Pressler has written (with co-author Don Yaeger) a book giving his view of the incident, It's Not About the Truth: The Untold Story of the Duke Lacrosse Rape Case and the Lives It Shattered.

Pressler demanded compensation from Duke for wrongful termination. In early June 2007, Pressler and Duke agreed upon a financial settlement for an undisclosed amount.
 
Then in October 2007, Pressler filed suit against Duke, alleging the university broke the terms of the confidential settlement. Pressler asserted that Duke broke the terms of the settlement when he was slandered by Duke senior vice president John Burness, who made disparaging comments about him, saying the difference between Pressler and the current lacrosse coach was "night and day." The suit sought to void the settlement and to pursue damages in a trial rather than by arbitration, as specified in his contract.

The trial judge ruled for Pressler's claims, and was upheld by the Court of Appeals on September 1, 2009.
Pressler's obligation to submit his claims to arbitration was voided by the June settlement. Pressler was free to proceed with his suit, including discovery. On March 31, 2010, the final day before discovery would start, Duke settled with Pressler. Although terms of the settlement were not disclosed, Duke issued an apology.

Head coaching record

References

1960 births
Living people
Army Black Knights men's lacrosse coaches
Bryant Bulldogs men's lacrosse coaches
Duke Blue Devils men's lacrosse coaches
VMI Keydets men's lacrosse coaches
Ohio Wesleyan Battling Bishops men's lacrosse coaches
Washington and Lee Generals football players
Sportspeople from Fairfield County, Connecticut
People from Wilton, Connecticut
American male writers
Wilton High School alumni